Harthill may refer to:

Harthill, Cheshire
Harthill, Derbyshire
Harthill, Scotland, on the border of North Lanarkshire and West Lothian
Harthill, South Yorkshire
Harthill Wapentake a former wapentake in the East Riding of Yorkshire